Pitane is a genus of moths in the family Erebidae.

Species
Pitane fervens Walker, 1854
Pitane napravniki Grados, 2004

References

Natural History Museum Lepidoptera generic names catalog

Phaegopterina
Moth genera